The Fourth Sea Lord and Chief of Naval Supplies originally known as the Fourth Naval Lord was formerly one of the Naval Lords and members of the Board of Admiralty which controlled the Royal Navy of the United Kingdom the post is currently known as Chief of Materiel (Fleet). As of 2017, it is also known as Chief of Fleet Support, Chief of Materiel (Ships) then as of 2020, Director General Ships.

History
The origin of this appointment dates back to 1830 when the post of Fourth Naval Lord was created until 1868 when it was re-styled Junior Naval Lord; this title remained until 1904 when it was again re-styled Fourth Sea Lord until 1964 when the Admiralty Department abolished this post. The modern equivalent is titled the "Naval Member for Logistics", who is responsible for the logistical support and the supply chain of the navy. Its functions along with two other departments of state were merged within a new Ministry of Defence. Following the merger a new post of Chief of Fleet Support was created, assuming the same responsibilities and duties until 2007 when it was renamed Chief of Materiel (Fleet). In around 2017, it was titled as Chief of Materiel (Ships) . In around August 2020, it was renamed as Director General Ships.

Duties
In 1805, for the first time, specific functions were assigned to each of the 'Naval' Lords, who were described as 'Professional' Lords, leaving to the 'Civil' Lords the routine business of signing documents.

The Fourth Sea Lord as Chief of Naval Supplies was responsible for supplying the navy, and his responsibilities included transport, victualling (supplying food), and medical services.

Fourth Naval Lords 1830–1868
Fourth Naval Lords include:
Captain George Barrington 1830-1833
Rear Admiral Sir Maurice Berkeley 1833-1835
Rear Admiral Sir Edward Troubridge 1835-1837
Rear Admiral Sir Maurice Berkeley 1837-1839
Rear Admiral Sir Samuel Pechell 1839-1841
Rear Admiral Sir James Dundas 1841
Rear Admiral Sir William Gordon 1841-1846
Rear Admiral Sir Henry Rous 1846
Rear Admiral Lord John Hay 1846-1847
Rear Admiral Sir Alexander Milne 1847-1852
Rear Admiral Arthur Duncombe 1852-1853
Rear Admiral Sir Alexander Milne 1853-1857
Rear Admiral Sir Frederick Pelham 1857-1858
Rear Admiral Sir James Drummond 1858-1859
Rear Admiral Sir Swynfen Carnegie 1859
Rear Admiral Sir Alexander Milne 1859
Rear Admiral Charles Frederick 1859-1861
Rear Admiral Sir James Drummond 1861-1866
Rear Admiral Sir John Dalrymple-Hay 1866-1868

Junior Naval Lords 1868-1904
Junior Naval Lords include:
Rear Admiral Lord John Hay 1868-1871
Rear Admiral Sir John Tarleton 1871-1872
Rear Admiral Sir Beauchamp Seymour 1872-1874
Rear Admiral Lord Gillford 1874-1879
Rear Admiral Sir John Commerell 1879-1880
Rear Admiral Sir Anthony Hoskins 1880-1882
Rear Admiral Sir Frederick Richards 1882-1885
Vice Admiral Sir William Hewett 1885
Captain William Codrington 1885-1886
Rear Admiral Sir James Erskine 1886
Captain Lord Charles Beresford 1886-1888
Rear Admiral Sir Charles Hotham 1888-1889
Rear Admiral Frederick Bedford 1889-1892
Rear Admiral Lord Walter Kerr 1892-1893
Rear Admiral Sir Gerard Noel 1893-1898
Rear Admiral Sir Arthur Moore 1898-1901
Rear Admiral Sir John Durnford 1901–1903
Rear Admiral Sir Frederick Inglefield 1903

Fourth Sea Lords 1904–1917
Fourth Sea Lords include:
Captain Frederick Inglefield 1904–1907
Rear Admiral Sir Alfred Winsloe 1907–1910
Rear Admiral Sir Charles Madden 1910–1911
Rear Admiral Sir William Pakenham 1911–1913
Rear Admiral Sir Cecil Lambert 1913–1916
Rear Admiral Sir Lionel Halsey 1916–1917
Rear Admiral Sir Hugh Tothill May 1917–October 1917

Fourth Sea Lord and Chief of Naval Supplies and Transport 1917-1964
Included:
Rear Admiral Sir Hugh Tothill October 1917-
Captain Sir Ernle Chatfield 1919–1920
Vice Admiral The Hon. Sir Algernon Boyle 1920–1924
Rear Admiral Sir John Kelly 1924–1927
Rear Admiral Sir William Fisher 1927–1928
Vice Admiral Sir Vernon Haggard 1928–1930
Vice Admiral Sir Lionel Preston 1930–1932
Rear Admiral Sir Geoffrey Blake 1932–1935
Vice Admiral Sir Percy Noble 1935–1937
Vice Admiral Sir Geoffrey Arbuthnot 1937–1941
Vice Admiral Sir John Cunningham 1941–1943
Vice Admiral Frank Pegram 1943–1944
Vice Admiral Sir Arthur Palliser 1944–1946
Vice Admiral Sir Douglas Fisher 1946–1948
Vice Admiral Sir Herbert Packer 1948–1950
Vice Admiral The Earl Mountbatten 1950–1952
Vice Admiral Sir Sydney Raw 1952–1954
Vice Admiral Sir Frederick Parham 1954–1955
Vice Admiral Sir Dymock Watson 1955–1958
Vice Admiral Sir Gordon Hubback 1958–1959
Vice Admiral Sir Nicholas Copeman 1959–1960
Vice Admiral Sir Michael Villiers 1960–1964
Vice Admiral Sir Raymond Hawkins 1964

Chiefs of Fleet Support 1964–2007
Chiefs of Fleet Support include:
Vice Admiral Sir Raymond Hawkins 1964-1967
Admiral Sir Francis Turner 1967-1971
Vice Admiral Sir Allan Trewby 1971-1974
Admiral Sir Peter White 1974-1977
Vice Admiral Sir James Eberle 1977-1979
Vice Admiral Sir William Pillar 1979-1981
Vice Admiral Sir James Kennon 1981-1983
Vice Admiral Sir Anthony Tippet 1983-1986
Vice Admiral Sir Benjamin Bathurst 1986-1989
Vice Admiral Sir Jock Slater 1989-1991
Vice Admiral Sir Neville Purvis 1991-1994
Vice Admiral Sir Toby Frere 1994-1997
Vice Admiral Sir John Dunt 1997-2000
Rear Admiral Brian Perowne 2000-2001
Rear Admiral Jonathon Reeve 2001-2004
Rear Admiral Paul Boissier 2004-2006
Rear Admiral Amjad Hussain 2006-2007

Chiefs of Materiel (Fleet)/Chief of Fleet (Support) 2007–2017
Chiefs of Materiel (Fleet) include:
Vice Admiral Sir Trevor Soar 2007-2009
Vice Admiral Sir Andrew Mathews 2009-2013
Vice Admiral Sir Simon Lister 2013-2017

Chief of Materiel (Ships) 2017 – 2020
Chief of Materiel (Ships) include
Vice Admiral Christopher Gardner 2019–Present

Director General Ships 2020 - present
Vice Admiral Sir Christopher Gardner 2020–Present

Departments under the office
At various times included:
 Auxiliary Patrol Office
 Department of the Director of Dockyards
Office of the Deputy Director of Dockyards
 Defence Equipment and Support (Fleet)
DE&S Investment Board
 Department of the Director of Mineweeping
 Department of the Director of Naval Equipment
 Department of the Director, Naval Stores
 Department of the Director of Victualling, (1878-1964)
 Dockyard Expense Accounts Department
 Naval Bases Operating Centre
 Office of the Comptroller of Victualling, (1832-1870)
 Office of the Director of Transports, (1855-1857)
 Office of the Director of Prisoners of War, 1855-1857)
 Office of the Director of Transport Service, (1862-1896)
 Office of the Director Ships Acquisitions
 Office of the Director Ships Support
 Office of the Director Submarines Acquisitions
 Office of the Director Submarines Support
 Office of the Superintendent of Victualling, (1870-1878)
 Royal Navy Bases
 Superintendent of Transports, (1829-1855)
 Transport Department

See also
 First Sea Lord
 Second Sea Lord
 Third Sea Lord
 Fifth Sea Lord

References

 

Royal Navy

Royal Navy appointments
Admiralty during World War II